Chehel Mani (also Romanized as Chehel Manī; also known as Chehel Maneh) is a village in Jahadabad Rural District, in the Central District of Anbarabad County, Kerman Province, Iran. At the 2006 census, its population was 85, in 22 families.

References 

Populated places in Anbarabad County